Yunny (Yönnö) is a rural locality (a selo) in Yunnovsky Selsoviet, Ilishevsky District, Bashkortostan, Russia. The population was 814 as of 2010. There are 9 streets.

Geography 
Yunny is located 7 km south of Verkhneyarkeyevo (the district's administrative centre) by road. Verkhneyarkeyevo is the nearest rural locality.

References 

Rural localities in Ilishevsky District